Trifle is a layered dessert.

Trifle(s) may also refer to:

 Trifle (metal), a grade of pewter  84 parts of tin, 7 of antimony, and 4 parts of copper
 Trifle (trimaran)  trimaran sailboat designed by Derek Kelsall and produced in 1966 
 Trifles (play), one-act play by Susan Glaspell
 Trifles (1930 film), short film based on the play with Jason Robards Sr. and Sarah Padden 
 a small piece of jewellery
 word meaning something of insignificance
 to treat (someone or something) without seriousness or with a lack of respect